Cobalt nitrate is the inorganic compound with the formula Co(NO3)2.xH2O. It is cobalt(II)'s salt.  The most common form is the hexahydrate Co(NO3)2·6H2O, which is a red-brown deliquescent salt that is soluble in water and other polar solvents.

Composition and structures
As well as the anhydrous compound Co(NO3)2, several hydrates of cobalt(II) nitrate exist. These hydrates have the chemical formula Co(NO3)2·nH2O, where n = 0, 2, 4, 6.

Anhydrous cobalt(II) nitrate adopts a three-dimensional polymeric network structure, with each cobalt(II) atom approximately octahedrally coordinated by six oxygen atoms, each from a different nitrate ion. Each nitrate ion coordinates to three cobalts. The dihydrate is a two-dimensional polymer, with nitrate bridges between Co(II) centres and hydrogen bonding holding the layers together. The tetrahydrate consists of discrete, octahedral [(H2O)4Co(NO3)2] molecules. The hexahydrate is better described as hexaaquacobalt(II) nitrate, [Co(OH2)6][NO3]2, as it consists of discrete [Co(OH2)6]2+ and [NO3]− ions.  Above 55 °C, the hexahydrate converts to the trihydrate and at higher temperatures to the monohydrate.

Uses and reactions
It is commonly reduced to metallic high purity cobalt. It can be absorbed on to various catalyst supports for use in Fischer–Tropsch catalysis.  It is used in the preparation of dyes and inks.

Cobalt(II) nitrate is a common starting material for the preparation of coordination complexes such as cobaloximes, carbonatotetraamminecobalt(III), and others.

Production
The hexahydrate is prepared treating metallic cobalt or one of its oxides, hydroxides, or carbonate with nitric acid: 
Co + 4 HNO3 +  4 H2O  → Co(H2O)6(NO3)2  +  2 NO2
CoO + 2 HNO3 +  5 H2O  → Co(H2O)6(NO3)2 
CoCO3  +  2 HNO3 +  5 H2O  → Co(H2O)6(NO3)2  +  CO2

References

Cobalt(II) compounds
Nitrates
Oxidizing agents